Karen Baldwin may refer to:
 Karen Dianne Baldwin (born 1963), Canadian actress, TV host and beauty queen
 Karen Baldwin (producer) (born 1964), Canadian film producer